The Altai Republic (Altai: , Altay Respublika; ,), also known as Gorno-Altai Republic, and colloquially, and primarily referred to in Russian to distinguish from the neighbouring Altai Krai as the Gornyi Altai, is a republic of Russia located in southern Siberia. It is the least-populous republic of Russia and least-populous federal subject in the Siberian Federal District. Gorno-Altaysk is the capital and the largest town of the republic.

The Altai Republic is one of Russia's ethnic republics, primarily representing the indigenous Altai people, a Turkic ethnic group that form 37% of the Republic's population, while ethnic Russians form a majority at 54%, and with minority populations of Kazakhs, other Central Asian ethnicities, and Germans. The official languages of the Altai Republic are Russian and Altai. Kazakh is official in areas of compact settlement of its speakers.

History 
The Xiongnu Empire (209 BC – AD 93) governed the territory of the modern Altai Republic. The area was part of the First Turkic Khaganate, the Uyghur Empire, and the Yeniseian Kyrgyzs. It was during this time that the local population became fully Turkicized culturally and linguistically.

The southern part of the Altai Republic came under the Naiman Khanate. The territory of the modern Altai Republic has been ruled by the Mongolic Xianbei state (93–234), Rouran Khaganate (330–555), Mongol Empire (1206–1368), Golden Horde (1240–1502), Zunghar Khanate (1634–1758) and Qing Empire (1757–1864).

The Qing period is a semi-autonomous period with the supervision of two Altan Nuur Uriankhai Governor Banners and part of the seven Altai Uriankhai banners. During the Qing administration, the General of Siberia Fedor Ivanovich Soimonov launched a non-military expedition into the Altan Nuur region in 1760 and began fort building. This was subsequently removed by Heseri Jalafungga of the Qing. Since the 1820s, the routine border check was less frequent and the Chuy drainage basin has been occupied by Russians.

The entire Altan Nuur Uriankhai region was annexed into the Russian Empire in 1864–1867 by the Treaty of Tarbagatai. During the Russian Civil War, the Confederated Republic of Altai (Karakorum-Altai Region) was established in 1918, and declared as the first step to rebuilding Genghis Khan's Mongol Empire. But it never became a competing force in the Russian Civil War, and stayed neutral from 1918 until January 1920, when it was annexed back into Russia. A second Altai Republic was formed in 1921 and lasted until 1922 when they were annexed by the Bolsheviks. 

On June 1, 1922, the Altaians regained autonomy with the creation of the Oyrot Autonomous Oblast, part of Altai Krai. The original name for this region was Bazla. On January 7, 1948, it was renamed Gorno-Altai Autonomous Oblast. In 1991 it was reorganized into the Gorno-Altai Autonomous Soviet Socialist Republic (ASSR). In 1992 it was renamed as the Altai Republic.

Geography

The Altai Republic is situated in the Altai Mountains in the very center of Asia at the junction of the Siberian taiga, the steppes of Kazakhstan and the semi-deserts of Mongolia. Forests cover about 25% of the republic's territory.

Area: 
Borders:
internal: Kemerovo Oblast (N), Republic of Khakassia (NE), Tuva Republic (E), and Altai Krai (W/NW).
international: Mongolia (Bayan-Ölgii Province) (SE), China (Altay Prefecture, Xinjiang) (S), and Kazakhstan (East Kazakhstan Province) (S/SW)
Highest point: Mount Belukha (4,506 m)
Maximum N–S distance: 360 km
Maximum E–W distance: 380 km

Rivers and lakes

More than 20,000 tributaries sprawl throughout the mountainous Republic, making for a total of more than  worth of waterways. The republic's largest rivers are the Katun and the Biya, both of which originate in the mountains and flow northwards. The junction of the two rivers eventually forms the Ob River, one of the longest rivers in Siberia, which flows northward to the Arctic Ocean.

The source of the black Biya River is Lake Teletskoye, the region's largest lake located in an isolated area far south in the mountains. The emerald-colored Katun River has its source at the Gebler glacier, which is situated on the Republic's highest point, Mount Belukha. The Katun River, in particular, holds a religious significance for native Altaians, as well as for many Russians who live in the area, as Mount Belukha is known in Altai folklore to be the gateway to the mystical kingdom of Shambhala.

The mountain lakes of Altai contain enormous freshwater reserves of a very pure quality as a result of their distance from civilization.

Mountains
The most striking geographical aspect of the Republic of Altai is its mountainous terrain. The Republic is situated within the Russian part of the Altai Mountains system, which covers a large part of the Republic and continues into neighboring Kazakhstan, Mongolia and China. The region continues to experience periodic notable seismic activity, which is visually made apparent through the mountains' characteristically high and rugged mountain ridges, separated by narrow and deep river valleys. The Republic's highest peak, Mount Belukha (4,506 m), is the highest point in Siberia.

Natural resources
Various bodies of water are among the most important natural resources of the Republic. Mineral and hot springs are popular destinations for tourists and locals, sought for their therapeutic effects. Additionally, Altai glaciers contain a great amount of fresh water. The general volume of ice for registered Altai glaciers comes to a total of 57 km3, 52 km3 of which is water. The total water stock of the glaciers exceeds the average annual effluence of all Altai rivers, which are equal to 43 km3 per year. The largest glaciers are Bolshoy Taldurinsky (35 km2), Mensu (21 km2), Sofiysky (17 km2), and Bolshoy Maashey (16 km2).

Mineral resources in the region primarily include gold, silver, iron ores, and lithium, in addition to other smaller amounts of minerals. The large city of Barnaul in neighboring Altai Krai was founded as a processing center for minerals from the Altai region, although the mineral extraction industry today is much smaller than in the past.

Climate
The republic has a temperate continental climate with relatively short and mild summers (June–August); and long, cold, and often quite frosty winters (November–March).

In general, the republic's climate of the southeastern areas, such as the (Ulagansky and Kosh-Agachsky Districts), is harsher than the climate of the less elevated northern areas.
Average annual temperature: +1 °C to −6.7 °C.
January temperature range: -9.2 °C to −31 °C.
July temperature range: +11 °C to +19 °C.

Average annual precipitation: 100–1000 mm.

Administrative divisions 

The Altai Republic is administratively divided into ten districts and Gorno-Altaysk Urban Okrug. The districts are further subdivided into ninety-two rural settlements.

Demographics 
Population:

Vital statistics 
Source: Russian Federal State Statistics Service

Ethnic groups
As per the 2021 Census, ethnic Russians make up 53.7% of the republic's population, with the indigenous Altai people making up 37.0%. Other groups include people of Kazakh (6.4%), together with smaller groups, each accounting for less than 0.5% of the total population.

 including 3,414 Telengits, 1,384 Kumandins and 344 Teleuts
 including 2,368 Telengits, 1,533 Tubalars, 931 Kumandins, 830 Chelkans, 141 Shors and 32 Teleuts
 including 3,648 Telengits, 1,891 Tubalars, 1,062 Kumandins, 1,113 Chelkans and 87 Shors
 including 2,587 Telengits, 3,424 Tubalars, 1,037 Kumandins, 1,170 Chelkans and 91 Shors
3,432 people were registered from administrative databases, and could not declare an ethnicity. It is estimated that the proportion of ethnicities in this group is the same as that of the declared group.

Politics 
The head of government in the Altai Republic is the Head of the Republic, popularly elected for a four-year term. , the Head of the Republic is Oleg Khorokhordin, who succeeded Alexander Berdnikov in this post.  The supreme legislative body of the republic is the State Assembly—El Kurultai, with 41 deputies popularly elected every four years. Igor Yaimov is the current Chairman of the State Assembly-El Kurultai from January 2002.

The Republic's Constitution was adopted on June 7, 1997.

Economy 
The Altai Republic is a highly agricultural region. However, it does have some industry which includes foodstuffs, non-ferrous metallurgy, chemicals, gold mining, footwear, dairying, and timber. Tourism has also begun to be a large part of the economy, and a significant number of new hotels and resorts have appeared.

Mining 
Alakhinskoye mine (lithium reserve)

Transportation 

The Altai Republic is one of the few Russian political divisions without rail access. The main paved road is the Chuysky Tract, which spans the republic from the capital Gorno-Altaisk in the north to the Mongolian border in the south. The republic's main paved road threads its way through the rugged Altai Mountains. A system of taxis and buses transports people between settlements. Within the settlements, people generally walk or ride horses.

Helicopters are used for emergency transportation, to supply remote government outposts, and by wealthy tourists. In 2012, runway capacity at the Gorno-Altaysk Airport near the republic's capital, was doubled. In June that same year, S7 Airlines started direct flights from Moscow. Prior to this, passengers used to fly through Barnaul in Altai Krai or Novosibirsk.

Tourism 

With the dissolution of the Soviet Union, the Altai Republic's tourism industry has greatly expanded. Although wealthy Russians from neighboring Russian regions are the most common sort of tourist in Altai, foreign interest has also grown in the area, especially due to the area's spiritual significance.

Popular tourist destinations tend to be concentrated in the north, where the roads are more accessible. They are also almost entirely located along the Chuiskiy highway, which is the main road from the north into the mountains (although it is currently only two lanes wide). The north is also significantly warmer than the elevated southern areas, which tend to be chilly even in the summer.

Some of the more well-known tourist spots in the Altai Republic include Lake Aiya, a popular bathing spot, and the picturesque Chemal region. More adventurous travelers sometimes visit the more remote Lake Teletskoye or Mount Belukha in the south.

Education 
There is one university (Gorno-Altaisk State University), twelve colleges, and 205 secondary schools in the republic.

Religion 

Different religions are present in Altai. According to a 2012 survey, 27.6% of the population adheres to the Russian Orthodox Church. The second most popular religions are ethnic and nature religions, namely Rodnovery (Slavic native faith), Tengrism (Central Asians' native faith) and Burkhanism, constituting altogether 13% of the population. 6% of the population follows Islam, 2% Hinduism (including Slavic-Vedic, Krishnaite, and Tantric movements), 1% are Old Believers and 1% Protestants. 25% of the population is "spiritual but not religious", 14% is atheist and 7.4% follows other religions or did not answer the question.

The traditional religion of the native Altaians is Tengrist shamanism, revived by modern Tengrist movements and Burkhanism. Ethnic Russians primarily practice Russian Orthodox Christianity and Rodnovery (Slavic native faith),  while Kazakhs are traditionally Muslims. Tibetan Buddhism has also recently begun making some inroads by way of neighboring Mongolia and Tuva.

It is unknown when Buddhism came into Altai but however, in various periods of history, the territory of the Altai and its population found themselves in full or partial subjection to neighboring states, where Buddhism was the official or one of the official religions: the state of the Khitans (tenth-twelfth centuries), the Mongol Empire (thirteenth-fourteenth centuries), and the Dzhungar Khanate (seventeenth-eighteenth centuries).

From 1904 until the 1930s, a new religious movement called Burkhanism (or Ak Jang, the "white faith") was popularized among native Altaians. The religion originated in Altai and emphasized the "white" aspect of shamanistic practice. Burkhanism remains an important component of Altai national consciousness and is currently being revived in several forms along with indigenous Altai culture in general.

Russian Pagan followers often go on pilgrimages to Mount Belukha, which is considered to be the location of Shambhala both by some Pagans and locals of Altai. One can often find manifestations of shamanistic spirituality in the region; for example, at points along the Katun River, local believers in shamanic religions are known to tie white ribbons to nearby trees and leave offerings of coins or food to the spirits. Although shamanism is much less widely practiced today, it is regaining popularity as a result of new religious freedom following the collapse of the Soviet Union.

Culture 
The indigenous Altai culture holds the lands of Altai to be sacred. The indigenous (Turkic) languages are focused on the stewardship of the lands. The Altai oral history is transmitted by throat-singers. The Altai culture was repressed during Soviet times and has been rebounding since then. The clans of all ten regions gather in the village of Yelo for a biennial cultural celebration.

There is also a large contingent of "Old Believers" who fled to Altai when they split from the Russian Orthodox Church over 300 years ago.

The UNESCO World Heritage Site "Golden Mountains" protects the Ukok Plateau, on which there are many standing stones and kurgans. Although archaeologists consider kurgans to be burial sites, the indigenous people believe that they are highly refined magnetic instruments for directing the flow of cosmic energy into the Earth. Thus, there is great local indignation about the excavation and removal of the Siberian Ice Maiden, an extraordinary 2,500-year-old mummy that had been preserved in permafrost.

Gorno-Altaisk is the location of the National Museum of the Altai Republic, which houses the mummy, the "Altai Princess", the National Library of the Republic of Altai, the National Theatre of the Republic of Altai and the Municipal House of Culture.

Regularly held national holiday Maslenitsa, Nowruz, Chaga – Bayram, received in February 2013 with the official status of the Republican celebration.

In 2013, the Altai Republic participated in the Turkvision Song Contest. The Altai Republic's entry was the song "Altayym Menin" performed by Artur Marlujokov. The Altai Republic placed fifth in the contest.

Sport 
Bandy is played in the Altai Republic.

Notable people 

 Alexander Berdnikov (born April 8, 1953), Chairman of the Government of the Altai Republic, and the head of the republic from January 20, 2006.
 Grigory Gurkin (January 24, 1870 – October 11, 1937), landscape painter.
 Mikhail Lapshin (September 1, 1934 – June 17, 2006),  President of the Altai Republic from January 19, 2002, to January 19, 2006.
 Sergey Mikayelyan (born April 27, 1992), cross-country skier.
 Viktor Shvaiko (b. 1965), painter.
 Semyon Zubakin (born May 4, 1952),  Head of the Altai Republic in Russia from January 13, 1998, to January 19, 2002.

See also 

 Music of Altai
 Altai-Sayan region

References

Citations

Sources

External links 

 Official website of the Altai Republic
 United Nations University digital video (2009) "Rediscovering Altai's human-nature relationships – Russia": a Telengit community leader and shaman from the Russian Altai's high altitude Kosh Agach Raion traversing Altai's sacred lands Accessed 1 December 2009

 
Central Asia
Russian-speaking countries and territories
States and territories established in 1922
Turkic peoples of Asia
Articles containing video clips
1922 establishments in Russia
Republics
Observer members of the International Organization of Turkic Culture